The Shatavar Vatika Herbal Park, Hisar, named after the shatavar herb, is a 125-acre herbal park for the conservation of several endangered ayurvedic medicinal herbs. It is located on Hisar-Dhansu road, which runs off 'Hisar-Barwala NH-52', in Hisar city of Haryana state in India.

The Shatavar Vatika Herbal Park is located 1 km northeast of Deer Park, both located on the 'Hisar-Dhansu link road' are run by the Forests Department of Government of Haryana. Vatika is 6 km away from Hisar Bus Stand and 7 km away from Hisar Railway Station.

Hisar Airport and Blue Bird Lake are also nearby.

Etymology

The park is named after the Shatavar (Asparagus racemosus) herb.

Details of the herbal park

Objectives of the herbal park

The 125 acre herbal park, setup in 2008–09, aims to preserve and propagate the endangered herbs. it also aims to educate people and farmers in commercial cultivation of these herbs to engage in profitable pursuits.

Herbs at park

The Forests Department, Haryana has planted several Ayurvedic medicinal herbs at the park including Ashvagandha (Indian Ginseng), Sarpagandha (Rauvolfia serpentina), Gwarpatha (Aloe vera), Mulethi (Liquorice), Shatavar (Asparagus racemosus), Brahmibooti (Centella asiatica), Chitrak (Plumbago), Baansa (Justicia adhatoda), Rosha Ghas (Cymbopogon martinii) - type of lemon grass, Akarkara (Anacyclus pyrethrum root) and Lehsunbel, etc., would be planted in the herbal garden.

Visitor facilities at park

The park has several visitor facilities, including lawns and swings for the kids, an observation watch tower, auditorium to showcase nature and environment related movies, public hall, collection of books on ayurveda, naturopathy and uses of medicinal herbs, etc.

Gallery 
Representative pictures of herbs found at Hisar Herbal park.

See also 

 Blue Bird Lake Hisar
 Kanwari Indus Valley Mound at Kanwari
 Tosham rock inscription at Tosham
 Asigarh Fort at Hansi
 Firoz Shah Palace Complex 
 Pranpir Badshah tomb at Hisar
 Mahabir Stadium
 Deer Park, Hisar
 Haryana Tourism

References 

Tourist attractions in Hisar district
Wildlife sanctuaries in Haryana
2008 establishments in Haryana
Protected areas established in 2008